Mannia is a genus of liverworts belonging to the family Aytoniaceae. It has a cosmopolitan distribution.

Species
The following species are recognised in the genus Mannia:
 
 Mannia androgyna (L.) A. Evans
 Mannia californica (Gottsche) L.C. Wheeler
 Mannia controversa (Meyl.) D.B. Schill
 Mannia fragrans (Balb.) Frye & L. Clark
 Mannia gracilis (F. Weber) D.B. Schill & D.G. Long
 Mannia hegewaldii Bischl.
 Mannia paradoxa R.M. Schust.
 Mannia perssonii Udar & V. Chandra
 Mannia pilosa (Hornem.) Frye & L. Clark
 Mannia sibirica (Müll. Frib.) Frye & L. Clark
 Mannia triandra (Scop.) Grolle

References

Aytoniaceae
Marchantiales genera